Ron Benner (born 1949) is an internationally recognized Canadian artist whose longstanding practice investigates the history and political economics of food cultures. He is also a gardener and writer who currently lives and works in London, Ontario.

Early life and career 
Ron Benner studied agricultural engineering for one year at the University of Guelph (1969–70). Finding himself ethically opposed to bioengineering, he began to travel and research the politics of food, and work as an artist in London, Ontario.

From 1975 through 1981, Ron was a member of the Forest City Artists' Association, and was manager of the Forest City Gallery in 1980–81. In 1983 he co-founded the Embassy Cultural House and served on the board until 1990. Co-organized the Mérida/London exchange (1980/81), as well as the Havana/London exchange (1988). In 1989 he was an artist/observer of the 3rd Havana Biennial.

In 2010 he was appointed Adjunct Research Professor in the Visual Arts Department, Western University.

His mixed media photographic installations are in the collections of the National Gallery of Canada, the Art Gallery of Ontario, Hart House (The University of Toronto), Museum London (London, Ontario), McIntosh Gallery (The University of Western Ontario), The Canada Council Art Bank and the Casa de Las Americas (Havana, Cuba).

Garden installations 
Ron's photographic garden installations have been installed in locations across Canada and in Salamanca and Sevilla, Spain. Involved with long-term and immersive research and physical investigation, these photos and species trace back the colonial history,  militarization of food, and map plants' economic and aesthetic values.

In 2020, Museum London documented Ron's garden in its 14th year entitled As the Crow Flies.

Selected solo exhibitions 

 2019  Trans/mission: Barley – Corn – Maize, Visual Arts Centre of Clarington, Bowmanville, ON, a year-long site-specific installation responding to the architecture and history of the former barley mill, curator Sandy Saad
 2017-  Trans/mission: Native to the Americas, permanent photographic/garden installation, sunken garden of the Wilfrid Laurier Library, organized by the Robert Langen Art Gallery, Wilfrid Laurier University, Waterloo, ON
 2017  Transend: Meeting Room, Robert Langen Art Gallery, Wilfrid Laurier University, Waterloo, ON, curator Suzanne Luke
 2016/17 Trans/mission: 101, photographic/garden installation, Kitchener-Waterloo Art Gallery, Kitchener, ON, curator Crystal Mowry presented in concert with CAFKA 16 (Contemporary Art Forum Kitchener Area)
 2015 Ron Benner: 3 Questions, McIntosh Gallery, Western University, London, ON, curator Julian Haladyn
 2015  All That Has Value, 3 guerrilla garden installations, in collaboration with CUPE, London, ON
 2015  In Digestion, Museum London, London, ON
 2013  Insubstantial Equivalence, photographic/garden installation, curator Peter Dykhuis, on the university campus in partnership with the agricultural faculty and the Dalhousie Art Gallery, Halifax, NS
 2012-15  Cuitlacoche – Your  Disease Our Delicacy,  photographic/garden installation, curator Su Ying  Lee, Hart House and Justina M. Barnicke Gallery, University of Toronto, Toronto, ON
 2010  /10, photographic/garden installation, curator Vicky Chainey Gagnon, site project on campus, Bishop's University, Sherbrooke, Québec
 2008  Trans/mission: Blé d’Inde, photographic/garden installation, curator Hannah Claus, Axené07, Gatineau, Québec
 2005-    As the Crow Flies, photographic/water garden installation, Museum London, London, ON
 2005-09 Trans/mission: Still Life, photographic/garden installations, co-ordinated through McIntosh Gallery, Western University, Grosvenor Lodge, London, ON
 2005 Trans/mission: Pineapple Vectors, Telegraph House, Port Stanley, ON
2003 Re-viewed, Art Gallery of Ontario, Toronto, Ontario.
 2003 Trans/mission: Vectors, Expression, Saint-Hyacinthe, Québec.
 2003-02 Trans/mission: African Vectors, Oakville Galleries, Oakville, Ontario.
 2002 Photographs 1997-2002, Colour by Schubert, London, Ontario.
 1999 Capital Remains, London Regional Art and Historical Museums, London, Ontario.
 1997/01 Trans/mission: Corn Vectors, University of Western Ontario, London, Ontario.
 1997/01  The Commodification of Life, public project, Ontario New Democratic Party Convention, Hamilton Convention Centre, Hamilton, Ontario.
 1997 In Digestion - Recent Acquisitions, London Regional Art & Historical Museums, London, Ontario.
 1996/95 All That Has Value, national touring exhibition: McIntosh Gallery, University of Western Ontario and Covent Garden Market, London, Ontario; Edmonton Art Gallery, Edmonton, Alberta; Presentation House Gallery, Vancouver, British Columbia; Dunlop Art Gallery, Regina, Saskatchewan. Curated by Peter White.
 1995 ANTHRO-APOLOGIES, Peru 1979-80, Art Gallery of Ontario, Toronto, Ontario.
 1992  ¿Valia La Pena?/ Natívas De Las Américas, Billboard Installation, La Carboneria Sevilla, Spain.
 1991  Selected Works 1976-90, Galerie Brenda Wallace, Montréal, Québec.
 1989  Ron Benner: Other Lives, Art Gallery of Windsor, Windsor, Ontario. Curated by Matthew Teitelbaum.
 1988  Bahia de Cochinos/ Bay of Pigs, Mercer Union, Toronto, Ontario.
 1988  Ron Benner: Other Lives, Mendel Art Gallery, Saskatoon, Saskatchewan. Curated by Matthew Teitelbaum.

Selected group exhibitions 

 2020 Enawenndewin/Relationships curated by William Kingfisher, McMaster Museum of Art, McMaster University, Hamilton, ON           
 2019 Enawendewin Project, Artspace Gallery, Peterborough, Ontario, curated by William Kingfisher
 2019 The World is a Garden: Jamelie Hassan & Ron Benner, SB Contemporary, Windsor, ON
 2019 401 West! Portrait of a Region, Art Gallery of Windsor, Windsor, ON
 2018 Imago Mundi, Onsite Gallery, Toronto, curator Francesca Valente
 2017 Imago Mundi, Venice, Italy, curator Francesca Valente
 2016 Toronto: Tributes and Tributaries, 1971-1989, Art Gallery of Ontario, Toronto, curator Wanda Nanibush
 2016 A Line Has Two Sides, Faculty and Staff Exhibition, Art Lab, Western University, London, ON, curator Susan Edelstein
 2015 The Second Silk Road International Festival, Xi'an, China
 2015 The Transformation of Canadian Landscape Art: The Inside and Outside of Being, Today Art Museum, Beijing, China
 2014 The World is a Garden while the Walls are the State, Jamelie Hassan and Ron Benner, A Space Gallery, Toronto, curator Vicky Moufawad-Paul
 2014 The Transformation of Landscape Art in Canada: The Inside and Outside of Being, curators Zhou Yan and Yang Chao, off-site project, Great Tang All Day Mall, Xi'an Art Museum, Xi'an, China
 2014 Futurity & Photography, Westland Art Gallery, London, ON, curator Troy Ouellette
 2014 Resistance, Manif d'art 7, Quebec City Biennial, off-site project in bus shelters in two locations in Quebec City, curator, Vicky Chainey Gagnon
 2013 Sample, Faculty and Staff Exhibition, curator Susan Edelstein, Art Lab, University of Western, London, ON
 2013 The World is a Garden, 2 person exhibition with Jamelie Hassan, Biblioteca Andrés Henestrosa, Oaxaca, Mexico, curator Freddy Aguilar
 2012 Bread & Butter, Jackman Humanities Institute/Hart House, University of Toronto, ON, curator Sandy Saad in collaboration with Barbara Fischer
 2012 Place Markers:Mapping Locations and Probing  group exhibition, Dalhousie Art Gallery, Halifax, NS, curator Peter Dykhuis
 2011 Windsor Biennial, curator Ian Baxter, Art Gallery of Windsor, Windsor, ON
 2011 Where will you be in eternity? Thielsen Gallery, London, ON
 2010 Nuit Blanche Retrospective, Bank of Nova Scotia Building, Toronto, ON
 2010 Growing Histories, Foreman Art Gallery, Bishop's University, Sherbrooke, Québec, curator Genevieve Chevalier and Vicky Chainey Gagnon
 2010 Natural.Disaster, McIntosh Gallery, University of Western Ontario, London, ON, curator Jessica Wyman
 2010 Minamata/Tunnel Vision, recent acquisitions, The Art Gallery of Windsor, Windsor, ON
 2009 Home/land & Security, Render Gallery, University of Waterloo, Waterloo, ON, curator Jeff Thomas
 2009 Orange: Aesthetics & Ethics, Expression, Saint-Hyacinthe, Québec, curator Marcel Blouin
 2006 – 08   Orientalism & Ephemera, curator Jamelie Hassan, Art Metropole, Toronto, Art Gallery of Windsor, Windsor; Ottawa Art Gallery, Ottawa; Centre A Gallery, Vancouver, BC.;  Art Gallery of the University of Saskatchewan, Saskatoon, Sask.
 2007 Bordercases: The Wall, The Art Gallery of Windsor, Windsor, ON
 2006 Science in Art, UQAM, Montréal, Québec
 2006 La Nuit Blanche, artists project : corn roast/ maize barbacoa, City of Toronto, curators Fern Bayer, Peggy Gale and Chrysanne Stathacos
 2006 Art Against War, Cube Gallery, Ottawa, Ont. Exhibiting artist and co-coordinator with Don Monet and Jamelie Hassan
 2006 Not Sheep : New Urban Enclosures and Commons, Artspeak Gallery, Vancouver, BC
 2005 Beyond Bounds: Art in London 1970 -1987, curator Robert McKaskell, Museum London, London, ON
 2005 Homerun, Recent Acquisitions, Museum London, London, ON
 2005 Paradigms of Citizenship, McIntosh Gallery, The University of Western Ontario, London, ON
2004 Open Air 2: Gateways & Gardens, (Trans/mission: Still Life), Grosvenor Lodge, University of Western Ontario, London, Ontario.
2004 Home & Away, (Ron Benner, Jamelie Hassan, John Tamblyn & Larry Towell), Michael Gibson Gallery, London, ON
 2003 Looking Left, Articule, Montréal, Québec.
 2003 Orange (markets), Expression, Saint-Hyacinthe, Québec.
 2003 Bookworks on the Fence, organized by Red Tree Collective, Toronto, Ontario; Epicentro, Mexico City, Mexico and Museum of Vera Cruz, Mexico.
 2002 To Eat or Not To Eat, Art Centre of Salamanca, Salamanca, Spain.
 2002 Out There is Somewhere: The Arctic in Pictures, Art Gallery of Windsor, Windsor, Ontario.
 2001 Continuities, Art Gallery of Windsor, Windsor, Ontario.
 2001 Pathways, McIntosh Gallery, University of Western Ontario, London, Ontario.
 2000 Logo City, Blackwood Gallery, University of Toronto at Mississauga, Mississauga, Ontario.
 1999 Case Studies: Still Life, York Quay Centre, Harbourfront Centre, Toronto, Ontario.
 1998 Fundamental Freedoms: The Artist and Human Rights, The National Gallery of Canada, Ottawa, Ontario.
 1998 Freedom, Diversity, Pluralism, Museum of Contemporary Art, Santiago, Chile.
 1998 A Gift for India, Sahmat, New Delhi, India.
 1998 Foodculture (Transmission: Corn Vectors), ArtLab project, University of Western Ontario, London, Ontario. Curated by Barbara Fischer.
 1997 Southwest Biennial, Art Gallery of Windsor, Windsor, Ontario. Curated by Robin Metcalfe
 1997 Track Records: Trains and Contemporary Photography, Oakville Galleries, Oakville, Ontario in collaboration with Canadian Museum of Contemporary Photography, Ottawa. Curated by Marnie Fleming.
 1995 AGW Southwest Biennial, Art Gallery of Windsor, Windsor, Ontario. Guest juror: Jessica Bradley.
 1995 Artists' Gardens, Harbourfront Centre, Toronto, Ontario.
 1994 Recent Acquisitions, National Gallery of Canada, Ottawa, Ontario.
 1994 Artists' Gardens, Harbourfront Centre, Toronto, Ontario.

References

21st-century Canadian artists
20th-century Canadian artists
Canadian male artists
Canadian contemporary artists
Living people
Artists from London, Ontario
1949 births
20th-century Canadian male artists
21st-century Canadian male artists